In economics, utility is the satisfaction or benefit derived by consuming a product. The marginal utility of a good or service describes how much pleasure or satisfaction is gained or lost by consumers as a result of the increase or decrease in consumption by one unit. There are three types of marginal utility. They are positive, negative, or zero marginal utility. For instance, you like eating pizza, the second piece of pizza brings you more satisfaction than only eating one piece of pizza. It means your marginal utility from purchasing pizza is positive. However, after eating the second piece you feel full, and you would not feel any better from eating the third piece. This means your marginal utility from eating pizza is zero. Moreover, you might feel sick if you eat more than three pieces of pizza. At this time, your marginal utility is negative. In other words, a negative marginal utility indicates that every unit of goods or service consumed will do more harm than good, which will lead to the decrease of overall utility level, while the positive marginal utility indicates that every unit of goods or services consumed will increase  the overall utility level.

In the context of cardinal utility, economists postulate a law of diminishing marginal utility, which describes how the first unit of consumption of a particular good or service yields more utility than the second and subsequent units, with a continuing reduction for greater amounts. Therefore, the fall in marginal utility as consumption increases is known as diminishing marginal utility. Economists use this concept to determine how much of a good or service that a consumer is willing to purchase.

Marginality 
In the study of Economics, the term marginal refers to a small change, starting from some baseline level. Philip Wicksteed explained the term as follows:
Marginal considerations are considerations which concern a slight increase or diminution of the stock of anything which we possess or are considering.

Another way to think of the term marginal is the cost or benefit of the next unit used or consumed, for example the benefit that you might get from consuming a piece of chocolate. The key to understanding marginality is through marginal analysis. Marginal analysis examines the additional benefits of an activity compared to additional costs sustained by that same activity. In practice, companies use marginal analysis to assist them in maximizing their potential profits and often used when making decisions about expanding or reducing production.

Utility 
As a topic of economics, utility is used to measure worth or value. Economists have commonly described utility as if it were quantifiable, that is, as if different levels of utility could be compared along a numerical scale. 

Initially, the term utility is equated usefulness with the production of pleasure and avoidance of pain by moral philosophers such as Jeremy Bentham and John Stuart Mill.  Moreover, under the influence of this philosophy, viewed utility as "the feelings of pleasure and pain" and further as a "quantity of feeling".

Contemporary mainstream economic theory frequently defers metaphysical questions, and merely notes or assumes that preference structures conforming to certain rules can be usefully proxied by associating goods, services, or their uses with quantities, and defines "utility" as such a quantification.

In any standard framework, the same object may have different marginal utilities for different people, reflecting different preferences or individual circumstances.

Law of diminishing marginal utility 

The British economist Alfred Marshall believed that the more of something you have, the less of it you want. This phenomenon is referred to as diminishing marginal utility by economists. Diminishing marginal utility refers to the phenomenon that each additional unit of gain leads to an ever-smaller increase in subjective value. For example, three bites of candy are better than two bites, but the twentieth bite does not add much to the experience beyond the nineteenth (and could even make it worse). This effect is so well established that it is referred to as the "law of diminishing marginal utility" in economics (Gossen, 1854/1983), and is reflected in the concave shape of most subjective utility functions. This refers to the increase in utility an individual gains from increasing their consumption of a particular good. "The law of diminishing marginal utility is at the heart of the explanation of numerous economic phenomena, including time preference and the value of goods ... The law says, first, that the marginal utility of each homogeneous unit decreases as the supply of units increases (and vice versa); second, that the marginal utility of a larger-sized unit is greater than the marginal utility of a smaller-sized unit (and vice versa). The first law denotes the law of diminishing marginal utility; the second law denotes the law of increasing total utility."

In modern economics, choice under conditions of certainty at a single point in time is modelled via ordinal utility, in which the numbers assigned to the utility of a particular circumstance of the individual have no meaning by themselves, but which of two alternative circumstances has higher utility is meaningful. With the ordinal utility, a person's preferences have no unique marginal utility, and thus whether or not the marginal utility is diminishing is not meaningful. In contrast, the concept of diminishing marginal utility is meaningful in the context of cardinal utility, which in modern economics is used in analyzing intertemporal choice, choice under uncertainty, and social welfare.

The law of diminishing marginal utility is that subjective value changes most dynamically near the zero points and quickly levels off as gains (or losses) accumulate. And it is reflected in the concave shape of most subjective utility functions.

Given a concave relationship between objective gains (x-axis) and subjective value (y-axis), each one-unit gain produces a smaller increase in subjective value than the previous gain of an equal unit. The marginal utility, or the change in subjective value above the existing level, diminishes as gains increase.

As the rate of commodity acquisition increases, the marginal utility decreases. If commodity consumption continues to rise, marginal utility at some point may fall to zero, reaching maximum total utility. Further increase in the consumption of commodities causes the marginal utility to become negative; this signifies dissatisfaction. For example, beyond some point, further doses of antibiotics would kill no pathogens at all and might even become harmful to the body. Diminishing marginal utility is traditionally a microeconomic concept and often holds for an individual, although the marginal utility of a good or service might be increasing as well. For example, dosages of antibiotics, where having too few pills would leave bacteria with greater resistance, but a full supply could effect a cure.

As suggested elsewhere in this article, occasionally, one may come across a situation where marginal utility increases even at a macroeconomic level. For example, providing a service may only be viable if it is accessible to most or all of the population. The marginal utility of a raw material required to provide such a service will increase at the "tipping point" at which this occurs. This is similar to the position with huge items such as aircraft carriers: the numbers of these items involved are so small that marginal utility is no longer a helpful concept, as there is merely a simple "yes" or "no" decision.

Marginalist theory 
Marginalism explains choice with the hypothesis that people decide whether to effect any given change based on the marginal utility of that change, with rival alternatives being chosen based upon which has the greatest marginal utility.

Market price and diminishing marginal utility 
If an individual possesses a good or service whose marginal utility to him is less than that of some other good or service for which he could trade it, then it is in his interest to effect that trade. Of course, as one thing is sold and another is bought, the respective marginal gains or losses from further trades will change. If the marginal utility of one thing is diminishing, and the other is not increasing, all else being equal, an individual will demand an increasing ratio of that which is acquired to that which is sacrificed. One important way in which all else might not be equal is when the use of the one good or service complements that of the other. In such cases, exchange ratios might be constant. If any trader can better his position by offering a trade more favorable to complementary traders, then he will do so.

In an economy with money, the marginal utility of a quantity is simply that of the best good or service that it could purchase. In this way it is useful for explaining supply and demand, as well as essential aspects of models of imperfect competition.

Paradox of water and diamonds 

The "paradox of water and diamonds" is most commonly associated with Adam Smith, though it was recognized by earlier thinkers. The apparent contradiction lies in the fact that water possesses a lower economic value than diamonds, even though water is far more vital to human existence. Smith suggested that there was an irrational divide between the 'use value' of something and the 'exchange value'. The things which have the greatest value in use frequently have little or no value in exchange; and likewise, things which have the greatest value in exchange have frequently little or no value in use. Nothing is more useful than water: but it will purchase scarcely anything. A diamond has hardly any practical value in use, but a great quantity of other goods may  be had in exchange for it.

Price is determined by both marginal utility and marginal cost, and here is the key to the apparent paradox. The marginal cost of water is lower than the marginal cost of diamonds. That is not to say that the price of any good or service is simply a function of the marginal utility that it has for any one individual or for some ostensibly typical individual. Rather, individuals are willing to trade based upon the respective marginal utilities of the goods that they have or desire (with these marginal utilities being distinct for each potential trader), and prices thus develop constrained by these marginal utilities.

Marginalism limitations 
Marginalism has many limitations like many economic theories. Economists often question if people act as they are portrayed within the theory. Understanding what is giving someone a specific amount of utility is extremely complex and varies from person to person and may not be stable. Another limitation is in regard to the way marginal change is measured. Measuring money is one of the simplest ways to analyse marginalism due to not having any other substitute. Although the limitation can be seen when attempting to measure the utility derived from other consumables such as food as there are too many substitutes and once again preferences can limit the accuracy.

Quantified marginal utility 
Under the special case in which usefulness can be quantified, the change in utility of moving from state  to state  is

(where "c.p." indicates that the only independent variable to change is ).

Mainstream neoclassical economics will typically assume that the limit

exists, and use "marginal utility" to refer to the partial derivative
.
Accordingly, diminishing marginal utility corresponds to the condition
.

History 
The concept of marginal utility grew out of attempts by economists to explain the determination of price.  The term "marginal utility", credited to the Austrian economist Friedrich von Wieser by Alfred Marshall, was a translation of Wieser's term  ("border-use").

Proto-marginalist approaches 
Perhaps the essence of a notion of diminishing marginal utility can be found in Aristotle's Politics, wherein he writes 

There has been marked disagreement about the development and role of marginal considerations in Aristotle's value theory.

A great variety of economists have concluded that there is some sort of interrelationship between utility and rarity that affects economic decisions, and in turn informs the determination of prices. Diamonds are priced higher than water because their marginal utility is higher than water .

Eighteenth-century Italian mercantilists, such as Antonio Genovesi, Giammaria Ortes, Pietro Verri, Marchese Cesare di Beccaria, and Count Giovanni Rinaldo Carli, held that value was explained in terms of the general utility and of scarcity, though they did not typically work-out a theory of how these interacted.  In Della moneta (1751), Abbé Ferdinando Galiani, a pupil of Genovesi, attempted to explain value as a ratio of two ratios, utility and scarcity, with the latter component ratio being the ratio of quantity to use.

Like the Italian mercantists, Étienne Bonnot, Abbé de Condillac, saw value as determined by utility associated with the class to which the good belong, and by estimated scarcity.  In  (1776), Condillac emphasized that value is not based upon cost but that costs were paid because of value.

This last point was famously restated by the Nineteenth Century proto-marginalist, Richard Whately, who in Introductory Lectures on Political Economy (1832) wrote:  (Whatley's student Senior is noted below as an early marginalist.)

Marginalists before the Revolution 

The first unambiguous published statement of any sort of theory of marginal utility was by Daniel Bernoulli, in "Specimen theoriae novae de mensura sortis".  This paper appeared in 1738, but a draft had been written in 1731 or in 1732.  In 1728, Gabriel Cramer had produced fundamentally the same theory in a private letter.  Each had sought to resolve the St. Petersburg paradox, and had concluded that the marginal desirability of money decreased as it was accumulated, more specifically such that the desirability of a sum were the natural logarithm (Bernoulli) or square root (Cramer) thereof.  However, the more general implications of this hypothesis were not explicated, and the work fell into obscurity.

In "A Lecture on the Notion of Value as Distinguished Not Only from Utility, but also from Value in Exchange", delivered in 1833 and included in Lectures on Population, Value, Poor Laws and Rent (1837), William Forster Lloyd explicitly offered a general marginal utility theory, but did not offer its derivation nor elaborate its implications.  The importance of his statement seems to have been lost on everyone (including Lloyd) until the early 20th century, by which time others had independently developed and popularized the same insight.

In An Outline of the Science of Political Economy (1836), Nassau William Senior asserted that marginal utilities were the ultimate determinant of demand, yet apparently did not pursue implications, though some interpret his work as indeed doing just that.

In "" (1844), Jules Dupuit applied a conception of marginal utility to the problem of determining bridge tolls.

In 1854, Hermann Heinrich Gossen published , which presented a marginal utility theory and to a very large extent worked-out its implications for the behavior of a market economy.  However, Gossen's work was not well received in the Germany of his time, most copies were destroyed unsold, and he was virtually forgotten until rediscovered after the so-called Marginal Revolution.

Marginal Revolution 
Marginalism eventually found a foothold by way of the work of three economists, Jevons in England, Menger in Austria, and Walras in Switzerland.

William Stanley Jevons first proposed the theory in "A General Mathematical Theory of Political Economy" (PDF), a paper presented in 1862 and published in 1863, followed by a series of works culminating in his book The Theory of Political Economy in 1871 that established his reputation as a leading political economist and logician of the time. Jevons' conception of utility was in the utilitarian tradition of Jeremy Bentham and of John Stuart Mill, but he differed from his classical predecessors in emphasizing that "value depends entirely upon utility", in particular, on "final utility upon which the theory of Economics will be found to turn." He later qualified this in deriving the result that in a model of exchange equilibrium, price ratios would be proportional not only to ratios of "final degrees of utility," but also to costs of production.

Carl Menger presented the theory in Grundsätze der Volkswirtschaftslehre (translated as Principles of Economics) in 1871.  Menger's presentation is peculiarly notable on two points.  First, he took special pains to explain why individuals should be expected to rank possible uses and then to use marginal utility to decide amongst trade-offs. (For this reason, Menger and his followers are sometimes called "the Psychological School", though they are more frequently known as "the Austrian School" or as "the Vienna School".) Second, while his illustrative examples present utility as quantified, his essential assumptions do not. (Menger in fact crossed-out the numerical tables in his own copy of the published Grundsätze.) Menger also developed the law of diminishing marginal utility. Menger's work found a significant and appreciative audience.

Walras's work found relatively few readers at the time but was recognized and incorporated two decades later in the work of Pareto and Barone.<ref>Donald A. Walker  (1987), "Walras, Léon" The New Palgrave: A Dictionary of Economics, v. 4, p. 862.</ref>

An American, John Bates Clark, is sometimes also mentioned.  But, while Clark independently arrived at a marginal utility theory, he did little to advance it until it was clear that the followers of Jevons, Menger, and Walras were revolutionizing economics.  Nonetheless, his contributions thereafter were profound.

 Second generation 

Although the Marginal Revolution flowed from the work of Jevons, Menger, and Walras, their work might have failed to enter the mainstream were it not for a second generation of economists.  In England, the second generation were exemplified by Philip Henry Wicksteed, by William Smart, and by Alfred Marshall; in Austria by Eugen von Böhm-Bawerk and by Friedrich von Wieser; in Switzerland by Vilfredo Pareto; and in America by Herbert Joseph Davenport and by Frank A. Fetter.

There were significant, distinguishing features amongst the approaches of Jevons, Menger, and Walras, but the second generation did not maintain distinctions along national or linguistic lines.  The work of von Wieser was heavily influenced by that of Walras.  Wicksteed was heavily influenced by Menger.  Fetter referred to himself and Davenport as part of "the American Psychological School", named in imitation of the Austrian "Psychological School". (And Clark's work from this period onward similarly shows heavy influence by Menger.)  William Smart began as a conveyor of Austrian School theory to English-language readers, though he fell increasingly under the influence of Marshall.

Böhm-Bawerk was perhaps the most able expositor of Menger's conception.Böhm-Bawerk, Eugen Ritter von. "Grundzüge der Theorie des wirtschaftlichen Güterwerthes", Jahrbüche für Nationalökonomie und Statistik v 13 (1886).  Translated as Basic Principles of Economic Value.  He was further noted for producing a theory of interest and of profit in equilibrium based upon the interaction of diminishing marginal utility with diminishing marginal productivity of time and with time preference. This theory was adopted in full and then further developed by Knut Wicksell and with modifications including formal disregard for time-preference by Wicksell's American rival Irving Fisher.

Marshall was the second-generation marginalist whose work on marginal utility came most to inform the mainstream of neoclassical economics, especially by way of his Principles of Economics, the first volume of which was published in 1890.  Marshall constructed the demand curve with the aid of assumptions that utility was quantified, and that the marginal utility of money was constant (or nearly so).  Like Jevons, Marshall did not see an explanation for supply in the theory of marginal utility, so he synthesized an explanation of demand thus explained with supply explained in a more classical manner, determined by costs which were taken to be objectively determined.  Marshall later actively mischaracterized the criticism that these costs were themselves ultimately determined by marginal utilities.

 Marginal Revolution and Marxism 
Karl Marx acknowledged that "nothing can have value, without being an object of utility",Marx, Karl Heinrich; Grundrisse (completed in 1857 though not published until much later) but in his analysis "use-value as such lies outside the sphere of investigation of political economy", with labor being the principal determinant of value under capitalism.

The doctrines of marginalism and the Marginal Revolution are often interpreted as somehow a response to Marxist economics. However the first volume of Das Kapital was not published until July 1867, after the works of Jevons, Menger, and Walras were written or well under way (Walras published  in 1874 and Carl Menger published Principles of Economics in 1871); and Marx was still a relatively minor figure when these works were completed. It is unlikely that any of them knew anything of him. (On the other hand, Friedrich Hayek and W. W. Bartley III have suggested that Marx, voraciously reading at the British Museum, may have come across the works of one or more of these figures, and that his inability to formulate a viable critique may account for his failure to complete any further volumes of Kapital before his death.

Nonetheless, it is not unreasonable to suggest that the generation who followed the preceptors of the Revolution succeeded partly because they could formulate straightforward responses to Marxist economic theory. The most famous of these was that of Böhm-Bawerk,  (1896), but the first was Wicksteed's "The Marxian Theory of Value. Das Kapital: a criticism" (1884, followed by "The Jevonian criticism of Marx: a rejoinder" in 1885). Initially there were only a few Marxist responses to marginalism, of which the most famous were Rudolf Hilferding's Böhm-Bawerks Marx-Kritik (1904) and Politicheskoy ekonomii rante (1914) by Nikolai Bukharin. However, over the course of the 20th century a considerable literature developed on the conflict between marginalism and the labour theory of value, with the work of the neo-Ricardian economist Piero Sraffa providing an important critique of marginalism.

It might also be noted that some followers of Henry George similarly consider marginalism and neoclassical economics a reaction to Progress and Poverty'', which was published in 1879.

In the 1980s John Roemer and other analytical Marxists have worked to rebuild Marxian theses on a marginalist foundation.

Reformulation 
In his 1881 work Mathematical Psychics, Francis Ysidro Edgeworth presented the indifference curve, deriving its properties from marginalist theory which assumed utility to be a differentiable function of quantified goods and services. Later work attempted to generalize to the indifference curve formulations of utility and marginal utility in avoiding unobservable measures of utility.

In 1915, Eugen Slutsky derived a theory of consumer choice solely from properties of indifference curves. Because of the World War, the Bolshevik Revolution, and his own subsequent loss of interest, Slutsky's work drew almost no notice, but similar work in 1934 by John Richard Hicks and R. G. D. Allen derived largely the same results and found a significant audience. (Allen subsequently drew attention to Slutsky's earlier accomplishment.)

Although some of the third generation of Austrian School economists had by 1911 rejected the quantification of utility while continuing to think in terms of marginal utility, most economists presumed that utility must be a sort of quantity. Indifference curve analysis seemed to represent a way to dispense with presumptions of quantification, albeit that a seemingly arbitrary assumption (admitted by Hicks to be a "rabbit out of a hat") about decreasing marginal rates of substitution would then have to be introduced to have convexity of indifference curves.

For those who accepted that indifference curve analysis superseded earlier marginal utility analysis, the latter became at best perhaps pedagogically useful, but "old fashioned" and observationally unnecessary.

Revival 

When Cramer and Bernoulli introduced the notion of diminishing marginal utility, it had been to address a paradox of gambling, rather than the paradox of value.  The marginalists of the revolution, however, had been formally concerned with problems in which there was neither risk nor uncertainty.  So too with the indifference curve analysis of Slutsky, Hicks, and Allen.

The expected utility hypothesis of Bernoulli and others was revived by various 20th century thinkers, with early contributions by Ramsey (1926), von Neumann and Morgenstern (1944), and Savage (1954). Although this hypothesis remains controversial, it brings not only utility, but a quantified conception of utility (cardinal utility), back into the mainstream of economic thought.

A major reason why quantified models of utility are influential today is that risk and uncertainty have been recognized as central topics in contemporary economic theory. Quantified utility models simplify the analysis of risky decisions because, under quantified utility, diminishing marginal utility implies risk aversion. In fact, many contemporary analyses of saving and portfolio choice require stronger assumptions than diminishing marginal utility, such as the assumption of prudence, which means convex marginal utility.

Meanwhile, the Austrian School continued to develop its ordinalist notions of marginal utility analysis, formally demonstrating that from them proceed the decreasing marginal rates of substitution of indifference curves.

See also 

 Diminishing returns
 Economic subjectivism
 Marginalism
 Microeconomics
 Paradox of value
 Pareto efficiency
 Rivalry (economics)
 Shadow price
 Theory of value (economics)
 Utility

References

Further reading

External links 
 
 Maximization of Originality

Marginal concepts
Utility
Welfare economics
Economics laws
Austrian School
Management cybernetics